The List of Long Island law enforcement agencies provides an inclusive list of law enforcement agencies serving New York's Long Island. This includes those agencies serving the New York City boroughs of Brooklyn and Queens on the western portion of Long Island along with those serving the suburban counties of Nassau County and Suffolk County.

Federal government agencies

 Bureau of Alcohol, Tobacco, Firearms and Explosives
 Amtrak Police Department
 Department of Defense Police
 Diplomatic Security Service
 Drug Enforcement Administration
 Federal Air Marshal Service
 Federal Bureau of Investigation
 Federal Bureau of Prisons
 Federal Reserve Police
 Immigration and Customs Enforcement
 IRS Criminal Investigation Division
 National Park Service Ranger (Law Enforcement)
 Naval Criminal Investigative Service
 Smithsonian Police (for the George Gustav Heye Center and the Cooper Hewitt, Smithsonian Design Museum)
 U.S. Army Criminal Investigation Command
 United States Coast Guard
 U.S. Customs and Border Protection
 United States Federal Protective Service
 U.S. Fish and Wildlife Service
 United States Marshals Service
 U.S. Marshals Service Eastern District of New York 
 United States Park Police
 United States Postal Inspection Service
 United States Postal Police
 U.S. Probation and Pretrial Services System
 United States Secret Service
 United States Department of Veterans Affairs Police (at the Brooklyn VA Hospital, St. Albans Community Living Center and Northport VA Hospital)

State agencies operating on Long Island

 New York State Office of the Attorney General
 Investigations Division
 Metropolitan Transportation Authority Police Department
 New York State Department of Corrections and Community Supervision
 New York State Court Officers
 New York State Department of Environmental Conservation Police
 New York State Forest Rangers
 New York State Office of Mental Health Police
 New York State Department of Motor Vehicles
 Division of Field Investigation
 New York State Park Police
 New York State Office for People With Developmental Disabilities Police
 New York State Police
 New York State Division of Homeland Security
 New York State Division of Military and Naval Affairs
 New York State University Police
 New York State Department of Taxation and Finance
 Criminal Investigations Division
 New York State Office of Tax Enforcement

Bi-state agencies

 Port Authority of New York and New Jersey Police Department (JFK Airport and LGA Airport in Queens)
 Waterfront Commission of New York Harbor Police (Brooklyn)

New York City 

 New York City Police Department (Police Officers)
 New York City Department of Environmental Protection Police (Police Officers)
 Fire Department of the City of New York Fire Marshals (Police Officers)
 New York City Department of Correction (Corrections Officers)
 New York City Department of Investigation (Special Officers)
 New York City Sheriff's Office (Deputy Sheriff)
 New York City Department of Citywide Administrative Services Police (Special Officers)
 New York City Department of Health and Hospitals Police (Special Officers)
 New York City Department of Homeless Services Police (Special Officers)
 New York City Human Resources Administration Police (Special Officers)
 New York City Parks Enforcement Patrol (Special Officers)
 New York City Department of Probation (Probation Officers)
 New York City Department of Sanitation Police (Special Officers)
 New York City Taxi and Limousine Commission Enforcement (Special Officers)
 City University of New York Public Safety Department (Public Safety Officers)

The New York City Transit Police and the New York City Housing Authority Police were merged into the NYPD in 1995, the Brooklyn Police Department and the Long Island City Police Department in 1898 and the Town of Morrisania Police Department in 1879.

Each of the five counties of New York City — New York (Manhattan), Bronx, Richmond (Staten Island), Kings (Brooklyn) and Queens — had a county sheriff's office. In 1942 they were merged to form the New York City Sheriff's Office. In 1939, the corrections part of the each county sheriff's office separated and became the consolidated New York City Department of Correction.

Nassau County 

Nassau County Police Department
Nassau County Sheriff's Department (New York) (Deputy Sheriffs are police officers. Correction Officers are peace officers)
Nassau County Probation Department (Peace Officer)
Nassau County Fire Marshals (Peace Officers)
 Nassau County SPCA (Peace Officers)
 Brookville Police Department.  
Centre Island Police Department
East Hills Department of Public Safety (Peace Officers)
Floral Park Police Department
Freeport Police Department
Garden City Police Department
Glen Cove Police Department
Glen Cove Harbor Patrol
Great Neck Estates Police Department
Hempstead Village Police Department
Kensington Police Department (New York)
Kings Point Police Department
Lake Success Police Department
Long Beach Police Department
Lynbrook Police Department
Malverne Police Department
Muttontown Police Department
Old Westbury Police Department
Old Brookville Police Department
Port Washington Police District
Oyster Bay Cove Police Department
Rockville Centre Police Department
Sands Point Police Department
Town of Hempstead Bay Constables (peace officers)
Town of North Hempstead Bay Constables (peace officers)
Town of Oyster Bay Bay Constables (peace officers)

Suffolk County

Suffolk County Police Department
Suffolk County Sheriff's Office (Deputy Sheriffs are police officers. Correction Officers are peace officers)
Suffolk County Probation Department (Peace Officer)
Suffolk County Fire Marshals (peace officers)
Suffolk County SPCA (peace officers)
Asharoken Police Department
Amityville Police Department
Babylon Village Code Enforcement (peace officers)
Belle Terre Village Constables (peace officers)
East Hampton Town Marine Patrol
East Hampton Town Police Department
East Hampton Village Police Department
Fisher's Island Constables (peace officers)
Head of the Harbor Police Department
Lloyd Harbor Police Department
Long Island MacArthur Airport Law Enforcement (peace officers)
Nissequogue Police Department
Northport Police Department
Ocean Beach Police Department
Old Field Village Constables (peace officers)
Port Jefferson Village Constables Bureau (peace officers)
Poquott Village Constables (peace officers)
Patchogue Village Constables (peace officers)
Quogue Police Department
Riverhead Town Police Department
Sag Harbor Police Department
Saltaire Police Department
Shelter Island Town Police Department
Southampton Town Bay Constables
Southampton Town Police Department
Southampton Village Police Department
Southold Town Police Department
Town of Babylon Bay Constable's Office (peace officers)
Town of Babylon Fire Marshal's Office (peace officers)
Town of Babylon Park Rangers (peace officers)
Town of Brookhaven Fire Marshals (peace officers)
Town of Brookhaven Park Rangers (peace officers)
Town of Brookhaven Harbormaster/Bay Constables (peace officers)
Town of Islip Fire Marshal's Office (peace officers)
Town of Islip Harbor Police (peace officers)
Town of Islip Park Rangers (peace officers)
Town of Huntington Harbormaster/Bay Constables (peace officers)
Town of Huntington Park Rangers (peace officers)
Town of Smithtown Department of Public Safety (peace officers)
Westhampton Beach Police Department
Westhampton Dunes Village Constables (peace officers)

Disbanded Agencies

State agencies 
 Long Island Rail Road Police (merged into Metropolitan Transportation Authority Police in 1997)
 Long Island State Parkway Police (merged into New York State Police and New York State Park Police in 1980)

New York City agencies 
ASPCA Humane Law Enforcement Division (disbanded in 2013)
New York City Transit Police (merged into the NYPD in 1995)
New York City Housing Authority Police (merged into the NYPD in 1995)

Nassau County Agencies 
Cove Neck Police
Laurel Hollow Police (absorbed by Nassau County PD - RMP 223)
Plandome Police (absorbed by Nassau County PD)
Woodsburgh Police (absorbed by Nassau County PD)

Suffolk County agencies 
Babylon Town Police Department (merged into Suffolk County Police Department in 1960)
Babylon Village Police Department (merged into Suffolk County Police Department in 1960)
Lindenhurst Police Department (merged into Suffolk County Police Department in 1960)
Brookhaven Town Police Department (merged into Suffolk County Police Department in 1960)
Patchogue Village Police Department (merged into Suffolk County Police Department in 1960)
Islip Town Police Department (merged into Suffolk County Police Department in 1960)
Brightwaters Police Department (merged into Suffolk County Police Department in 1960)
Huntington Town Police Department (merged into Suffolk County Police Department in 1960)
Smithtown Town Police Department (merged into Suffolk County Police Department in 1960)
Suffolk County Park Rangers (merged into Suffolk County Park Police in 1991)
Greenport Police Department (merged into Southold Town Police Department in 1994)
Hampton Bays Police Department (merged into Southampton Town Police Department in 19??)
Suffolk County Park Police (merged to SCPD in 2014)

See also
 List of law enforcement agencies in New York (state)

References

Law enforcement in New York (state)
Long Island
Long Island-related lists